Barbara Albright (July 2, 1955 in Nebraska – July 5, 2006 in Branford, Connecticut) was an American author of about 25 food and knitting books.

Biography 
Albright graduated from Fremont High School in Fremont, Nebraska and from the University of Nebraska–Lincoln with a bachelor's degree in food and nutrition.  In 1980, she received her master's degree in nutrition communications from Boston University.

She was the author or co-authored of numerous cookbooks and knitting books, including Cooking with Regis and Kathie Lee (which reached number one on the New York Times bestseller list), Entertaining with Regis and Kathie Lee, Mostly Muffins and its followup More Muffins (both with Leslie Weiner), Oddball Knitting, and The Natural Knitter.

She was a food editor at Redbook and Woman's World magazines and editor-in-chief of The Chocolatier magazine. She also wrote articles for Good Housekeeping, Traditional Home, Family Fun and Country Living magazines and the Associated Press.

In 1999, she was inducted into the James Beard Cookbook Hall of Fame.

A resident of Wilton, Connecticut, Albright died of a brain tumor at a Branford, Connecticut hospice at age 51 on July 5, 2006.

Bibliography 
 Mostly Muffins: Quick and Easy Recipes for Over 75 Delicious Muffins and Spreads. St Martin's Griffin. November 1984. .
 Cooking With Regis & Kathie Lee: Quick & Easy Recipes From America's Favorite TV Personalities. Hyperion. February 1993. .
 Totally Teabreads: Quick & Easy Recipes For More Than 60 Delicious Quick Breads & Spreads. St. Martin's Griffin. February 1994. .
 Entertaining With Regis & Kathie Lee: Year-Round Holiday Recipes, Entertaining Tips, and Party Ideas. Hyperion. October 1995. .
 Girl Food: Cathy's Cookbook for the Well-Balanced Woman. Andrews McMeel Publishing. June 1997. .
 Margaritas. Andrews McMeel Publishing. 2000. .
 Knitter's Stash: Favorite Patterns from America's Yarn Shops. Interweave Press. September 2001. .
 Simple Knits for Sophisticated Living: Quick-Knit Projects from Beautiful, Chunky Yarns. Quarry Books. January 2003. .
 1,001 Reasons to Love Chocolate. Stewart, Tabori and Chang. October 2004. .
 Odd Ball Knitting: Creative Ideas for Leftover Yarn. Potter Craft. September 2005. .
 The Natural Knitter: How to Choose, Use, and Knit Natural Fibers from Alpaca to Yak. Potter Craft. March 2007. .

References

1955 births
2006 deaths
American food writers
American instructional writers
American magazine editors
People from Fremont, Nebraska
Writers from Nebraska
University of Nebraska–Lincoln alumni
Boston University alumni
Women food writers
Women cookbook writers
Deaths from brain cancer in the United States
20th-century American women writers
20th-century American non-fiction writers
21st-century American women writers
American women non-fiction writers
21st-century American non-fiction writers
Women magazine editors